The 1956 United States presidential election in Nebraska took place on November 6, 1956, as part of the 1956 United States presidential election. Voters chose six representatives, or electors, to the Electoral College, who voted for president and vice president.

Nebraska was won by incumbent President Dwight D. Eisenhower (R–Pennsylvania), running with Vice President Richard Nixon, with 65.51% of the popular vote, against Adlai Stevenson (D–Illinois), running with Senator Estes Kefauver, with 34.49% of the popular vote.

With 65.51% of the popular vote, Nebraska would prove to be Eisenhower's fourth strongest state after Vermont, Maine and New Hampshire.

Results

Results by county

See also
 United States presidential elections in Nebraska

Notes

References

Nebraska
1956
1956 Nebraska elections